Albert Perikel (3 May 1913 – 9 August 1989) was a Belgian racing cyclist. He rode in the 1939 Tour de France.

References

1913 births
1989 deaths
Belgian male cyclists
Place of birth missing